Augusto César Leal Angulo (3 June 1931 – 29 January 2013) was a Mexican chemist and politician affiliated with the PAN. He served as Senator of the LX and LXI Legislatures of the Mexican Congress representing Sinaloa. He also served as Deputy between 1994 and 1997.

References

1931 births
2013 deaths
People from Sinaloa
Members of the Senate of the Republic (Mexico)
Members of the Chamber of Deputies (Mexico)
National Action Party (Mexico) politicians
Mexican chemists
21st-century Mexican politicians
20th-century Mexican politicians
Instituto Politécnico Nacional alumni